Greens Equo of the Valencian Country (VerdsEquo) is a valencianist and ecologist political party based in the Valencian Country, Spain.  VerdsEquo is a part of the Compromís coalition.

Ideology 
According to its statutes, the fundamental purpose of VerdsEquo is to promote a project of sustainable society based on political ecology, social equity and participatory democracy, assuming as their own the goals and objectives of federal Equo. VerdsEquo will also support the recovery and development of the cultural, linguistic and social personality of the Valencian Country.

History
VerdsEquo was created in 2014 as a result of the merger of two previous political parties: The Greens - Ecologist Left of the Valencian Country (EV-EE) and the Valencian federation of Equo (Equo PV).

Currently, VerdsEquo has two deputies in the Valencian Parliament, Juan Ponce and Cristina Rodríguez Armigen, that were elected as part of the Compromís coalition in the 2015 Valencian elections. The current spokespersons of the party are Julià Álvaro Prat and Cristina Rodríguez Armigen.

References

External links
  Official website of Coalició Compromís 

Political parties in the Valencian Community
Regionalist parties in Spain
Green political parties in Spain
Valencian nationalism
Equo